John Leslie Mackie  (25 August 1917 – 12 December 1981) was an Australian philosopher. He made significant contributions to the philosophy of religion, metaphysics, and the philosophy of language.

Mackie had influential views on metaethics, including his defence of moral scepticism and his sophisticated defence of atheism. He wrote six books. His most widely known, Ethics: Inventing Right and Wrong (1977), opens by boldly stating, "There are no objective values." It goes on to argue that because of this, ethics must be invented rather than discovered. His posthumously published The Miracle of Theism: Arguments For and Against the Existence of God (1982) has been called a tour de force in contemporary analytic philosophy. The atheist philosopher Kai Nielsen described it as "one of the most, probably the most, distinguished articulation of an atheistic point of view given in the twentieth century." In 1980 Time magazine described him as "perhaps the ablest of today's atheistic philosophers."

Life
Mackie was born 25 August 1917 in Killara, Sydney, son of Alexander Mackie, professor of education at the University of Sydney and principal of the Sydney Teachers College, influential in the educational system of New South Wales. and Annie Burnett (née Duncan), who was a schoolteacher.

Mackie graduated from the University of Sydney in 1938 after studying under John Anderson, sharing the medal in philosophy with Harold Glass. Mackie received the Wentworth Travelling Fellowship to study greats at Oriel College, Oxford, where he graduated with first-class honours in 1940.

During the Second World War Mackie served with the Royal Electrical and Mechanical Engineers in the Middle East and Italy, and was mentioned in dispatches. He was professor of philosophy at the University of Otago in New Zealand from 1955 to 1959 and succeeded Anderson as the Challis Professor of philosophy at the University of Sydney from 1959 to 1963. In 1963, he moved to the United Kingdom, becoming the inaugural holder of the chair of philosophy in the University of York, a position he held until 1967, when he was elected a fellow of University College, Oxford, where he served as praelector. In 1969, he gave a lecture, "What's Really Wrong with Phenomenalism?", at the British Academy as part of its annual Philosophical Lectures series. In 1974, he became a fellow of the British Academy.

Mackie died in Oxford on 12 December 1981.

Character and family
Mackie is said to have been capable of expressing total disagreement in such a genial way that the person being addressed might mistake his comment for a compliment. This personal style is exemplified by the following words from the preface to Ethics: Inventing Right and Wrong:

I am nowhere mainly concerned to refute any individual writer. I believe that all those to whom I have referred, even those with whom I disagree most strongly, have contributed significantly to our understanding of ethics: where I have quoted their actual words, it is because they have presented views or arguments more clearly or more forcefully than I could put them myself.

Mackie married Joan Meredith in 1947. One of their three children, Penelope Mackie, also became a philosopher. She lectured in philosophy at the University of Birmingham from 1994 to 2004, and then at the University of Nottingham from 2004 until her death in 2022. Mackie's son David is also a philosopher and graduated from Oxford University, where he held lectureships at Exeter College, Corpus Christi College, and Christ Church before being appointed a Fellow and Tutor at Oriel College. He is Head of Philosophy at D'Overbroeck's College, Oxford. His daughter Hilary is a classicist at Rice University.

Philosophical work
Mackie is best known for his contributions to metaethics, philosophy of religion, and metaphysics. In metaethics, he took a position called moral scepticism, arguing against the objective existence of right and wrong as intrinsically normative entities on fundamental grounds. He was unsure what kinds of thing they would be if they existed.

His most widely known work, Ethics: Inventing Right and Wrong, bluntly begins with the sentence "There are no objective values". He uses several arguments to support this claim. He argues that some aspects of moral thought are relative, and that objective morals require an absurd intrinsic action-guiding feature. Most of all, he thinks it is very unclear how objective values could supervene on features of the natural world (see the Argument from queerness), and argues it would be difficult to justify our knowledge of "value entities" or account for any links or consequences they would have. Finally, he thinks it possible to show that even without any objective values, people would still have reason to firmly believe in them (hence he claims that it is possible for people to be mistaken or fooled into believing that objective values exist). The Times called the book "a lucid discussion of moral theory which, although aimed at the general reader, has attracted a good deal of professional attention."

Concerning religion, he was well known for vigorously defending atheism, and also arguing that the problem of evil made untenable the main monotheistic religions. His criticisms of the free will theodicy are particularly significant. He argued that the idea of human free will is no defence for those who wish to believe in an omnicompetent being in the face of evil and suffering, as such a being could have given us both free will and moral perfection, thus resulting in us choosing the good in every situation. In 1955 he published "Evil and Omnipotence", which summarized his view that belief in the existence of evil and an all-powerful, all-knowing and all-good god is "positively irrational".

Mackie's views on this so-called logical problem of evil prompted Alvin Plantinga to respond with the "free-will defense", which Mackie later responded in his The Miracle of Theism.

In metaphysics, Mackie made significant contributions relating to the nature of causal relationships, especially conditional statements describing them (see, for example, Mackie 1974) and the notion of an INUS condition.

After being given a copy of Richard Dawkins's The Selfish Gene as a Christmas present, in 1978 Mackie wrote an article in the journal Philosophy praising the book and discussing how its ideas might be applied to moral philosophy. The philosopher Mary Midgley responded in 1979 with "Gene-Juggling", an article arguing that The Selfish Gene was about psychological egoism rather than evolution. This started a dispute between Mackie, Midgley, and Dawkins that was ongoing at the time of Mackie's death.

Publications

Books
 Truth, Probability, and Paradox (1973), Oxford University Press, .
 The Cement of the Universe: A Study of Causation (1980 [1974]), Oxford University Press, .
 Problems from Locke (1976), Oxford University Press, .
 Ethics: Inventing Right and Wrong (1977), Viking Press, . (1978 Reprint Available for loan at Open Library)
 Hume's Moral Theory (1980), Routledge Keegan & Paul, .
 The Miracle of Theism: Arguments for and against the Existence of God (1982), Oxford University Press, .

Anthologies
 Logic and Knowledge: Selected Papers, Volume I (1985), Oxford University Press, .
 Persons and Values: Selected Papers, Volume II (1985), Oxford University Press, .
For a more complete list of works see "The publications of J. L. Mackie" compiled by Joan Mackie.

References

Further reading
 McDowell, John. (1991) "Mackie, John Leslie, 1917–1981" in Proceedings of the British Academy 76 
Franklin, James. (2003) Corrupting the Youth: A History of Philosophy in Australia, Macleay Press, ch. 5. (author shared eprint)
 Honderich, Ted. (ed). (1985) Morality and Objectivity: A Tribute to J. L. Mackie, Routledge Kegan & Paul, .
 
 

1917 births
1981 deaths
20th-century atheists
20th-century Australian male writers
20th-century Australian non-fiction writers
20th-century Australian philosophers
20th-century British male writers
20th-century British philosophers
20th-century essayists
Academics of the University of York
Alumni of Oriel College, Oxford
Analytic philosophers
Australian atheism activists
Atheist philosophers
Australian emigrants to the United Kingdom
Australian essayists
Australian ethicists
Australian expatriates in New Zealand
Australian male non-fiction writers
British Army personnel of World War II
British essayists
British ethicists
British male non-fiction writers
British philosophers
British secularists
Critics of Christianity
Critics of religions
Epistemologists
Fellows of the British Academy
Fellows of University College, Oxford
Lecturers
Metaphilosophers
Metaphysicians
Ontologists
Philosophers of language
Philosophers of religion
Philosophy academics
Philosophy writers
Royal Electrical and Mechanical Engineers soldiers
Academic staff of the University of Otago
University of Sydney alumni
Academic staff of the University of Sydney
Writers about religion and science